Alicia Napoleon Espinosa (born January 26, 1986) is an American professional boxer who held the WBA female super middleweight title from 2018 to January 2020. As of September 2020, she is ranked as the world's third best active female super middleweight by The Ring and BoxRec.

In 2015 she co-founded and became co-owner and trainer of Overthrow Boxing Club based underground in Manhattan. She was a judge at the Long Island Fight for Charity Event – America’s only charity boxing event completely run by volunteers. In 2018 Napoleon made history when she fought (and beat) Hannah Rankin at the NYCB Live’s Nassau Coliseum.  This was the first time a women’s boxing match had taken place at the arena. On December 9, 2018, Napoleon Ring 8 honored her as the New York State Female Fighter of the Year at their annual Holiday Awards Ceremony. In the four-rounder that took place in May 2015 – a game that sold $30,000 value in tickets – she defeated Hungary’s Melinda Lazar, who was also 1-0 at the time, via unanimous decision. She has trained Adriana Lima and Britney Spears. Her work and achievements have been featured in: Allure, Muscle & Fitness, Spoon University and Everlast. Her paintings are on display at Gallery 212 in the Wynwood Arts District.

References

Living people
American women boxers
1986 births
Middleweight boxers
21st-century American women